Lita Chevret (May 27, 1908 – May 23, 2001) was an American actress who began her career at the genesis of sound films. She appeared in over 60 films between 1929 and 1940, although in most of those she had small or non-billed parts.

Life
Chevret was born on May 27, 1908 in Oakland, California, to show-business parents, who ensured that she received training in both singing and dance.

Career
Chevret began acting with a stock theater company when she was 16 years old. She also appeared in Berkeley productions of Irving Pichel and in Fanchon and Marco revues.

Based on her dancing ability, Chevret broke into the film business in 1929's Fox Movietone Follies of 1929, with an uncredited role.  The following year she appeared in Words and Music in a small unbilled role, in John Wayne's first film where he had a significant role (billed as Duke Morrison). That same year, she appeared in RKO Radio Pictures' Rio Rita, their most successful picture of the year.

In 1930, RKO would offer Chevret a 3-year contract, which would be renewed for an additional 3 years. However, she was relegated to mostly small and bit roles while under contract with RKO. When her contract expired in 1936, she made the decision not to renew, and to attempt to become a freelance actress.

She continued acting for another five years, still in small and often unbilled roles, until her retirement in 1941. Her final role was a small part in The Philadelphia Story.

After film
Disappointed with her continuing to be cast in smaller roles, Chevret retired in 1941. Although she had left the film industry, she remained in show business during World War II, touring with the USO, finally retiring for good by the end of the war.

She lived in Palm Springs, California until her death in 2001 four days before her 93rd birthday.

Personal life
Chevret was married to Alfred Hickman and Carlton Williams.

Filmography
(Filmography based on the AFI database, with supplemental information from Media Bang)

References

1908 births
2001 deaths
Actresses from California
People from Oakland, California
Actresses from Palm Springs, California
20th-century American actresses